New View may refer to:

The New View, published by the Socialist Party, State of New Jersey

Albums

 New View (Eleanor Friedberger album), a 2016 album by American indie rock musician Eleanor Friedberger
 New View! (John Handy album), a 1967 live album by saxophonist John Handy and his quintet
New View, album by Chris Laurence (2007)

Songs
"New View" by Tim Ries Quintet Composed by Tim Ries
"New View" by Robert Lucas (musician) Composed by Robert Lucas